Izhar Ashdot (born 23 November 1958) is an Israeli singer-songwriter, guitarist, and record producer. He is a co-founding member of the Israeli rock band T-Slam.

Early life
When he was eleven, Ashdot started to play the guitar, two years later he founded his first group, "The Red Dogs".

In 1977 he was recruited to the Israel Defense Forces Radio as a music programming editor, while simultaneously he worked on his own music and recorded the song "Me'uma Lo Kara" (Nothing Happened) which eventually became T-slam's biggest hit, retitled  "Lir'ot Ota Haiom" (See Her Today) . While working for the Army Radio he met Yair Nitzani and Dani Bassan, and together they formed a Disco company and played as DJs in parties. After a while they left the Disco style and started to play Rock, founded the band T-Slam, and were joined by Yoshi Sade, Tzuf Philosof and Sami Avzardel.

Musical career
T-Slam became famous with their single "Radio Hazak" (Loud Radio), and later with the releasing of its album with the same name, which was certified platinum. In March 1981 their first tour began and was very successful. T-Slam won numerous Israeli awards, including "The Band of the Year", and "The Song of the Year" with "See Her Today."

After recording 3 albums, T-Slam disbanded in 1983, and Ashdot decided to create and produce music. In the 80s he worked with numerous artists, including Boaz Sharabi, Si Himan, Adam, Corinne Allal, Alon Ole'archik, Friends of Natasha (החברים של נטאשה) and Ofra Haza. A year later, Nitzani announced that "Galbi", a Yemenite song performed by Ofra Haza, would be produced by Izhar. In 1987 Izhar produced another song for Haza, "Im Nin'Alu". The single was a number 1 single in most European countries and became the 2nd best selling in Europe in 1988, topping the Eurochart and receiving heavy rotation on MTV. Her album, "Shaday", produced by Ashdot, was also a great success.

Solo career
After the successful T-Slam reunion shows in 1990, Ashdot started to work on his first solo album, released in 1992 and eventually reaching "gold" status. The album included "Ish HaShokolad" (Chocolate Man), "HaLelilot Shelanu" (Our Nights), "Ma Tomri" (What Will You Say) and "No'a Shel HaYam" (The Sea's No'a). Two years later he recorded his second album, which included "Hiroshima Sheli" (My Hiroshima) and "Tzilo Shel Yom Kaitz" (Summer Day's Shadow).

The album "Hofa'a Haya BeHard Rock Cafe" (Live at the Hard Rock Cafe) that was released in 1995 included many of his songs in new live performances, and two new songs.

While producing albums for other artists, Ashdot continued to work on his own work and released his fourth album, "Zman Kesem" (Magic Time). In 2000, after the release of the first Israeli music downloads internet site, Izhar released a compilation album only through the internet, called "Lech Im HaLev" (Go with the Heart). The album included performances from live shows and previously unreleased recordings. Between 2003 and 2005 he recorded his 5th album, "BeMerhak Negi'a MiKan".

In 2007 Ashdot released another compilation album, "Our Nights". In addition to Izhar's greatest hits, the album included three new songs – Kvish LeKivun Ehad ("One Way Road"), which he composed to his and Filosof's lyrics; Le'an Paneinu Achshav (Free Translation: "Where Are We Headed Now") and Mata'ei HaDuvdevan Shel Ukraina (" The Cherry Orchards of Ukraine"), in which he cooperated with Israeli singer and rapper Muki.

In January 2008, Izhar expanded his band and went on a new tour, celebrating his love for Irish music. On "Rikud Katan – The Irish Tour", Izhar invited multi instrumentalist Ehud Nathan, who fronts the Celtic-Irish instrumental band "Ktifa Sh'hora" (Black Velvet), and violinist Dina Lurie to join his band. The successful tour yielded the live album Rikud Katan, which included the eponymous hit song.

In September 2012, Izhar released his fifth studio album, Inian Shel Hergel(A Matter of Habit). The title track  created a large impact in October 2012 due to its criticism of the Israeli army. The controversy surrounding the song led to its ban on Israel Defense Forces Radio.

In 2016 and 2017 Izhar released three new singles:

In July 2018, Izhar released his 6th studio album, Kach Holech Ha'Rooach (So Goes the Wind), co-produced with Moshe Levi.
The album included six songs co-written with Yali Sobol and six instrumental tracks which Izhar composed and performed with a Eurorack Modular synthesizer rig.

Solo Discography

 Izhar Ashdot – 1992
 Izhar Ashdot II – 1994
 Live at the Hard Rock Cafe – 1995
 Zman Kesem – 1999
 Lech Im HaLev – 2000
 BeMerhak Negi'a MiCan (A Touch Away) – 2005
 HaLeilot Shelanu (Our Nights) – 2007
 Live! - Rikud Katan - Hasivuv Ha'iri (Live – The "Irish" Tour) – 2008
 Inian Shel Hergel (A Matter of Habit) – 2012
 Solo. Live! – 2013
 Kach Holech Ha'Rooach (So Goes the Wind) – 2018

Personnel
Some of the musicians who played on Izhar's albums and in his live band:
 Raviv Gazit (Keyboards and Arrangement) 1991–1992
 Tzuf Philiosof (Bass Guitar and Vocals) 1980 –
 Eran Porat (Drums) 1992–2004
 Shay Baruch (Drums) 2004 –
 Tal Bergman (Drums) – Studio 1993–2005, 2017
 Yossi Fine (Bass) – Studio 1993–1994
 Ran Efron (Keyboards and Guitar) 1994 –
 Moshe Levy (Keyboards and Production) 1993–
 Peter Roth (musician) (Bass and Vocals) – Studio 2004–, Live 2015–
 Ehud Nathan (Buzuki, Mandolin, Whistle, Bohron) – "Irish" Tour 2008–2014
 Dinah Luria (Violin) – "Irish" Tour 2008–

References

External links

  Official WebSite
  Facebook Page

1958 births
Living people
Israeli film score composers
Israeli Jews
20th-century Israeli male singers
Israeli record producers
Musicians from Jerusalem
Male film score composers
21st-century Israeli male singers